Giuseppe Silo Domenico Fontana, known as José Fontana (Cabbio, 28 October 1840 — Lisbon, 2 September 1876) was a Swiss-Italian-born naturalized-Portuguese publisher, intellectual and one of the founders of the Portuguese Socialist Party.

References

1840 births
1870s suicides
1876 deaths
Portuguese people of Italian descent
Swiss emigrants to Portugal